Onokhoy-Shibir (Onokhoi Sheber) is a rural locality (a selo) in Zaigrayevsky District, Republic of Buryatia, Russia. The population was 105 as of 2010. There are 3 streets.

Geography 
Onokhoy-Shibir is located 30 km northwest of Zaigrayevo (the district's administrative centre) by road. Stary Onokhoy is the nearest rural locality.

References 

Rural localities in Zaigrayevsky District